Changyang Tujia Autonomous County or in Tujia language known as Changryangf Bifzivkar Zivzirxianf is an autonomous county in western Hubei province, People's Republic of China. It is under the administration of the prefecture-level city of Yichang.

The county is located in the basin of the Qing River, a right tributary of the Yangtze. The river is dammed by the Geheyan Dam (located within the county) and the Gaoba Dam (located in the neighboring Yidu County-level City, but flooding some of the Qingjiang River valley within Changyang County as well). The resulting reservoirs provide the main water transportation route throughout much of the county.

Administrative divisions
Eight towns:
Longzhouping, Gaojiayan, Moshi, Duzhenwan, Ziqiu, Yuxiakou, Langping, Hejiaping

Three townships:
Dayan Township, Yazikou Township, Huoshaoping Township

Climate

Transportation
The new Yichang-Wanzhou Railway crosses the northwestern part of the county, with two stations - Langping  and Hejiaping - located near the eponymous towns of the county.

The China National Highway 318, and the newly constructed Shanghai-Chongqing Expressway (G50) run roughly parallel to the railway. Building the expressway in this area required the construction of a number of tunnels and remarkable bridges, such as the Longtanhe Bridge just outside Langping Town.

References

Counties of Hubei
Geography of Yichang
Tujia autonomous counties